Oyón is a town in Central Peru, capital of the province Oyón in the Department of Lima.

References 
  Instituto Nacional de Estadística e Informática. Banco de Información Digital. Retrieved February 21, 2008.

Populated places in the Lima Region